Makarovskoye (Makar) is a rural locality (a selo) in Bolsheareshevsky Selsoviet, Kizlyarsky District, Republic of Dagestan, Russia. The population was 304 as of 2010. There are 3 streets.

Geography 
Makarovskoye is located 37 km northeast of Kizlyar (the district's administrative centre) by road. Bolshaya Areshevka and Novye Bukhty are the nearest rural localities.

Nationalities 
Nogais, Dargins and Avars live there.

References 

Rural localities in Kizlyarsky District